= Pseudopanotrogus kuluensis =

Scientific classification
- Kingdom: Animalia
- Phylum: Arthropoda
- Clade: Pancrustacea
- Class: Insecta
- Order: Coleoptera
- Suborder: Polyphaga
- Infraorder: Scarabaeiformia
- Family: Scarabaeidae
- Genus: Pseudopanotrogus
- Species: P. kuluensis

Binomial name
- Pseudopanotrogus kuluensis (Moser, 1919)

Synonyms
- Brahmina kuluensis Moser, 1919; Brahmina pubescens Arrow, 1921

Species of beetle

Pseudopanotrogus kuluensis is a species of beetle of the family Scarabaeidae. It is found in India (Himachal Pradesh).

== Description ==
Adults reach a length of about 10 mm. They are similar to Pseudopanotrogus donckieri. They are reddish-yellow and glossy, with short grey hairs. The head is sparsely covered with bristled punctures. The pronotum is twice as wide as long posteriorly, arched in the middle and the anterior angles are obtuse, while the posterior angles are rounded. Both the anterior and lateral margins are fringed with erect cilia and the surface is densely covered with short-haired punctures. The elytra lack ribs and are densely, weakly wrinkled-punctate. These punctures are short-haired. The hairy punctures on the pygidium are less densely spaced than on the elytra. The thorax is covered with grey hairs, the abdomen almost smooth in the middle, densely covered with hairy punctures on the sides.
