= Pseudopanotrogus donckieri =

Scientific classification
- Kingdom: Animalia
- Phylum: Arthropoda
- Class: Insecta
- Order: Coleoptera
- Suborder: Polyphaga
- Infraorder: Scarabaeiformia
- Family: Scarabaeidae
- Genus: Pseudopanotrogus
- Species: P. donckieri

Binomial name
- Pseudopanotrogus donckieri (Brenske, 1892)

Synonyms
- Brahmina donckieri Brenske, 1892; Panotrogus nepalensis Frey, 1969; Pseudopanotrogus kashmirensis Petrovitz, 1969; Brahmina clypealis Moser, 1915

Species of beetle

Pseudopanotrogus donckieri is a species of beetle of the family Scarabaeidae. It is found in Nepal and India (Jammu & Kashmir, Sikkim).

== Description ==
Adults reach a length of about 12 mm. They are brown and shiny, with light brown antennae.
